James McGee (born 10 June 1987) is an Irish former professional tennis player. He was born in Castleknock, Ireland. He attended Belvedere College in Dublin, Co. Dublin.

Personal life
McGee was born to Kieran and Marie McGee. He started playing tennis at the age of seven at Castleknock. He won his school's tennis championship in 2002, 2003 and 2004, and was also awarded the Most Outstanding Player of the Year in Ireland in 2003. He was educated at Belvedere College in Dublin and then obtained a major in Psychology from North Carolina State University in 2008.

Career
McGee has spent most of his career on the Futures and Challenger circuits. As of 9 June 2014, he has played in 10 Davis Cup ties for Ireland with a record of 13 wins and 8 losses (9–5 in singles & 4–3 in doubles).

2014

McGee had finished 2013 in good form and continued this into 2014, reaching the semi-finals of the BNP Paribas de Nouvelle-Calédonie in Nouméa, equalling his best performance at a challenger. He then competed in Australian Open qualifying but lost in his first match to eventual qualifier Jimmy Wang. McGee later recorded an impressive win over top 100 player Alex Bogomolov, Jr. at the Challenger of Dallas and then narrowly missed out on making his first ATP World Tour main draw the following week, losing in the final round of qualifying at the U.S. National Indoor Tennis Championships to David Goffin. In March, McGee played in qualifying for the BNP Paribas Open, an ATP World Tour Masters 1000 event, but was again defeated by Goffin. He then helped Ireland to a 3–2 victory over Egypt in the Davis Cup, winning both his singles rubbers in straight sets.

In late April, McGee once again equalled his best challenger result, reaching the semi-finals of the Tallahassee Tennis Challenger. He then went on to win his first ever Grand Slam qualifying match, defeating Norbert Gomboš at the French Open and then stunning Guido Pella in two sets in the following round. McGee, however, was unable to become the first Irish tennis player since Sean Sorensen, in 1982, to reach the French Open main draw, as he lost in straight sets to Andrea Arnaboldi. In early June, McGee once again reached the final round of qualifying for an ATP World Tour event, this time at the Queen's Club Championships, but came up just short in a tight three sets match against Daniel Brands. McGee next competed at Wimbledon qualifying but was defeated in straight sets by Aljaž Bedene.

McGee then travelled to North America for the summer hardcourt swing. He first competed at the Nielsen Pro Tennis Championships but lost out to Tim Smyczek in the second round. McGee then came his closest to making an ATP World Tour main draw at the Hall of Fame Tennis Championships, where he lost to Ante Pavić in a final set tie-break in the final qualifying round. He then reached the semi-finals of the Challenger Banque Nationale de Granby. This result saw him break into the top 200 of the rankings for the first time in his career, reaching a new high of 193. He also made the semi-finals of the doubles with Chase Buchanan. The following week, at the Kentucky Bank Tennis Championships, McGee defeated the number one seed Evgeny Donskoy in the opening round. He was eliminated at the quarter-final stage by 2011 champion Wayne Odesnik. In the doubles he again played with Chase Buchanan and the pair reached the final, the first challenger final of McGee's career, but they were defeated in straight sets. The following week he lost to Vincent Millot in the opening round of the Odlum Brown Vancouver Open.

McGee qualified for his first ever grand slam main draw at the 2014 US Open after defeating Zhang Ze in the final round of qualifiers in 3 sets. He also defeated Gonzalo Lama and Yuki Bhambri during the qualifying stages. McGee faced Aleksandr Nedovyesov in the first round of the main draw where he lost in 4 sets. Despite this defeat, the prize money earned for reaching the first round accounted for more than a quarter of his career earnings to date.

ATP Challenger and ITF Futures finals

Singles: 12 (5–7)

Doubles: 11 (5–6)

Singles performance timeline

References

External links
 
 
 

1987 births
Living people
Irish male tennis players
Tennis players from Dublin (city)
People educated at Belvedere College